The 1976 NFL Championship Series was the 1st edition of the NFL Night Series, an NFL-organised national club Australian rules football tournament between the leading clubs from the VFL, the SANFL and the WANFL.

It replaced the Championship of Australia tournament that been contested between the champion clubs of the VFL, the SANFL, the WANFL and the Tasmanian State Premiership between 1972 and 1975.

The 1976 NFL Night Series was planned as a forerunner to a full-scale national competition in 1977 that would feature all the VFL, SANFL and WANFL teams plus representative teams from Tasmania, Queensland, New South Wales and the ACT.

Ultimately, the 1976 competition would be the only one to feature the VFL clubs - the Victorian League chose to break away in 1977 and run a rival competition, the VFL Night Series.

Qualified Teams

1 Includes previous appearances in the Championship of Australia.
2 Replaced Collingwood and St Kilda who both declined to participate.

Venues

Group stage

Group A

Group B

Group C

Group D

Knockout stage

Semi-finals

NFL Championship Series final

References

Australian rules interstate football
History of Australian rules football
Australian rules football competitions in Australia
1976 in Australian rules football